Charles Richard John Spencer-Churchill, 9th Duke of Marlborough,  (13 November 1871 – 30 June 1934), styled Earl of Sunderland until 1883 and Marquess of Blandford between 1883 and 1892, was a British soldier and Conservative politician, and a close friend of his first cousin Winston Churchill. He was often known as "Sunny" Marlborough after his courtesy title of Earl of Sunderland.

Early life and education
Born at Simla, British India, Marlborough was the only son of the then Marquess of Blandford (who succeeded as The 8th Duke of Marlborough in July 1883) and Lady Albertha Frances Anne, daughter of The 1st Duke of Abercorn. He was a nephew of Lord Randolph Churchill and a first cousin of Sir Winston Churchill, with whom he had a close and lifelong friendship. He was educated at Winchester College and Trinity College, Cambridge.

Political career

Marlborough entered the House of Lords on the early death of his father in 1892, and made his maiden speech in August 1895. In 1899, he was appointed Paymaster-General by Lord Salisbury, a post he held until 1902. He was then Under-Secretary of State for the Colonies under Arthur Balfour between 1903 and 1905. He was sworn of the Privy Council in 1899.

He again held political office during the First World War, when he was Joint Parliamentary Secretary to the Board of Agriculture and Fisheries between 1917 and 1918 in David Lloyd George's coalition government. He made his last speech in the House of Lords in December 1931.

Shortly before the coronation of King Edward VII and Queen Alexandra, Marlborough was invested as a knight of the Order of the Garter (KG) at Buckingham Palace on 30 May 1902. He subsequently served as Lord High Steward at the coronation the following August (the coronation had originally been scheduled for June). He went to India to attend the January 1903 Delhi Durbar as a guest of the Viceroy, Lord Curzon. 

The Duke of Marlborough was Mayor of Woodstock between 1907 and 1909, and Lord Lieutenant of Oxfordshire from 1915 until his death.

He was President of the National Fire Brigades Union and founded the British Cotton Growers Association. He was also, after his father, a prominent member of the Ancient Order of Druids, and patron of the prestigious AOD Albion Lodge based at Oxford. On 10 August 1908, in the park of Blenheim Palace, he welcomed the ceremony of initiation of his cousin, Winston Churchill as a Druid.

Military career

Marlborough was appointed a Lieutenant in the Queen's Own Oxfordshire Hussars in 1897. After the outbreak of the Second Boer War, he was in January 1900 seconded for service as a Staff Captain in the Imperial Yeomanry serving in South Africa, and received the temporary rank of Captain. He arrived in Cape Town in March 1900, and left for Naauwpoort in Northern Cape Colony with the Oxford company of the Imperial Yeomanry.

He was subsequently appointed Assistant Military Secretary to Lord Roberts, Commander-in-Chief of the British forces in South Africa, and was aide-de-camp to Lieutenant-General Ian Hamilton.

He was mentioned in despatches and promoted to Major on 7 December 1901. After the formation of the Territorial Army he was appointed Honorary Colonel of the 3rd (Special Reserve) Battalion of the Oxfordshire and Buckinghamshire Light Infantry in 1908.

He was promoted Lieutenant-Colonel of his yeomanry regiment in 1910, serving until 1914. He was awarded the Territorial Decoration (TD) in 1913. He rejoined during the First World War, when he served as a Lieutenant-Colonel on the General Staff in France. During a visit at the Western Front to his cousin Winston who was then serving in the trenches, both narrowly missed being killed when a piece of shrapnel (now displayed at Blenheim Palace) fell between them. He was later Honorary Colonel and commandant of the Oxfordshire Volunteer Regiment of the Volunteer Training Corps from 1918 to 1920.

Marriages and issue
 
Marlborough was married twice. His first wife was the American railroad heiress Consuelo Vanderbilt, whom he married at Saint Thomas Church in New York City on 6 November 1895. The marriage was a mercenary one. Inheriting his near-bankrupt dukedom in 1892, he was forced to find a quick and drastic solution to the financial problems of his family. Prevented by the strict social dictates of late 19th-century society from earning money, he was left with one solution; to marry money. 

The marriage was celebrated following lengthy negotiations with his bride's divorced parents: her mother, Alva Vanderbilt, was desperate to see her daughter a duchess, and the bride's father, William Vanderbilt, paid for the privilege. The final price was $2,500,000 (worth about $77m in 2021) in 50,000 shares of the capital stock of the Beech Creek Railway Company with a minimum 4% dividend guaranteed by the New York Central Railroad Company. The couple were each given a further annual income of $100,000 for life. The bride later claimed she had been locked in her room until she agreed to the marriage. The contract was actually signed in the vestry of St. Thomas Episcopal Church, immediately after the wedding vows had been made. Whilst they honeymooned in Europe, Marlborough told Consuelo that he actually loved another woman but had married her to "save Blenheim".

They had two sons, John Spencer-Churchill, Marquess of Blandford, eventually the 10th Duke of Marlborough, and Lord Ivor Spencer-Churchill. Their mother famously referred to them as "the heir and the spare".

The Vanderbilt dowry was used to restore Blenheim Palace and replenish its furnishings and library, for many of the original contents had been sold over the course of the 19th century. Many of the jewels worn by subsequent Duchesses of Marlborough also date from this period. The 9th Duke employed noted landscape gardener Achille Duchêne to create the water garden on the terrace at Blenheim. In 1934 he owned 19,685 acres of land.

However, Consuelo was far from happy; she recorded many of her problems in her autobiography The Glitter and the Gold. Consuelo was also unfaithful; her liaisons included her first love, Winthrop Rutherfurd (who was alleged to be the father of her second son, Lord Ivor, since he allegedly bore no resemblance to either the Duke nor his brother), and three of her husband's cousins: Hon. Freddie Guest (son of Ivor Guest, 1st Baron Wimborne, and Lady Cornelia Spencer-Churchill), Hon. Reginald Fellowes (son of William Fellowes, 2nd Baron de Ramsey, and Lady Rosamund Spencer-Churchill) and Charles, Viscount Castlereagh. 

The couple shocked society by separating in 1906. In order to facilitate the divorce, Alva Vanderbilt testified that she had coerced her daughter into marrying the Duke. The couple were divorced in 1921; the marriage was annulled by the Vatican on 19 August 1926, no doubt facilitated by the Duke's wish to become a Roman Catholic. Consuelo subsequently married a Frenchman, Jacques Balsan. She died in 1964, having lived to see her son become Duke of Marlborough; she frequently returned to Blenheim, the house she had found uncomfortable and inconvenient when living there.

In the late 1890s, the Duke invited to Blenheim Palace Gladys Deacon, another American, who became friends with Consuelo. Deacon, the daughter of Edward Parker Deacon, became the Duke's mistress soon after moving into the palace. She and Marlborough were married on 25 June 1921 in Paris, shortly after his divorce from Consuelo.

Later in life the Duke converted to Catholicism in 1927, around which time the couple began drifting apart and Deacon took to keeping a revolver in her bedroom to prevent her husband’s entry. He moved out of the palace, and two years later evicted her. The couple separated but never divorced.

In popular culture
Marlborough was played by David Markham in the ITV drama Winston Churchill: The Wilderness Years.

References

External links

 

|-

109
Garter Knights appointed by Edward VII
Lord High Stewards
Lord-Lieutenants of Oxfordshire
United Kingdom Paymasters General
Members of the Privy Council of the United Kingdom
Charles Spencer-Churchill, 9th Duke of Marlborough
1871 births
1934 deaths
Queen's Own Oxfordshire Hussars officers
British Army personnel of the Second Boer War
Imperial Yeomanry officers
English Roman Catholics
Converts to Roman Catholicism from Anglicanism
People educated at Winchester College
Members of the Ancient Order of Druids
British Army personnel of World War I
Knights of the Garter